I Musici (pronounced ), also known as I Musici di Roma, is an Italian chamber orchestra from Rome formed in 1951. They are well known for their interpretations of Baroque and other works, particularly Antonio Vivaldi and Tomaso Albinoni.

Among their engagements, the original chamber orchestra completed acclaimed tours of Southern Africa 1956, and again in 1967, with a few  replacement performers

In the 1970s, I Musici recorded the first classical music video and, later, the group was the first to record a compact disc for the Philips label.

One of their founding members and first violin, Felix Ayo, is still an active violinist as of 2017.

Instrumentation 
I Musici consists of a group of string instruments and one harpsichord. The strings include six violins, two violas, two cellos, and one double bass.

Members 
I Musici is a conductorless ensemble; the relationships among the twelve musicians enable great harmony in their music-making.

I Musici today

Violins: Antonio Anselmi, Marco Serino, Ettore Pellegrino, Pasquale Pellegrino, Francesca Vicari, Gian Luca Apostoli
Viola: Massimo Paris, Silvio Di Rocco
Celli: Vito Paternoster, Pietro Bosna
Double bass: Roberto Gambioli
Harpsichord: Francesco Buccarella

Former members
Violins: Salvatore Accardo, Federico Agostini, Felix Ayo, Arnaldo Apostoli, Claudio Buccarella, Pina Carmirelli, Italo Colandrea, Anna Maria Cotogni, Walter Gallozzi, Roberto Michelucci, Antonio Salvatore, Virgil Simons, Mariana Sirbu, Franco Tamponi, Luciano Vicari
Violas: Dino Asciolla, Aldo Bennici, Paolo Centurioni, Carmen Franco, Alfonso Ghedin, Bruno Giuranna
Celli: Enzo Altobelli, Mario Centurione, Francesco Strano
Double bass: Lucio Buccarella
Harpsichord: Maria Teresa Garatti

References

External links 

Chamber orchestras
Italian orchestras
Musical groups established in 1951
1951 establishments in Italy
Deutsche Grammophon artists